Samar is a female/male given name, gender is based on the country. It is used in several languages.

Sanskrit 
Samar in Sanskrit, the word originates from an ancient manuscript, Samarangana Sutradhara, or "Battlefield Commander" (sometimes abbreviated "the Samar"), detailing techniques of warfare and ancient Hindu aeronautics, composed in Sanskrit by King Bhoja of Dhar of the Paramara Dynasty in the 11th Century A.D. It is also referred as time in folk phrases.

Arabic 
Samar is generally an Arabic female given name meaning "evening conversations (including Arabic music and poetry)". Samar is a female name in Islamic culture.

Another meaning used as a female given name bears the meaning "the night and its blackness", where the saying goes: "lā âtiy-hi samara (لا آتيهِ سَمَرًا)", meaning "do not come to samar (that is, night)" or another meaning used as the "brown" like the shadow of the moon.

The name or adjective itself stems from the root verb samara (سَمَرَ) meaning "chat with one another at the night, having an evening of entertainment".

Another possibility Arabs where the name is used stems from the root verb Samra (سمرأ) meaning "to have a dark complexion - brown, embrown, tan" or "to make something brown - browning, brownish". Also, the name is from the brown colour that is the shadow of the moon.

Samar in Arabic is a cognate of the Hebrew name Shamar, which means "preservation, protection, conservation".

This name is the stem or root of other Arabic given names associated with this name, the variants are:

 Samer (سَامِر sāmir) - male given name
 Samir (سَمِير samīr) - male given name 
 Samira (سَمِيرة samīrah) - female given name formed from the male given name Samir (سَمِير samīr)

Hindi 
Samar is a Hindi male given name and means "war" from the Sanskrit Samara.

People with the surname Samar (Sanskrit/ Hindi)
Akim Samar (1916 - 1943), Soviet Nanai poet
Devi Lal Samar, founder-director of the Bharatiya Lok Kala Mandal folk-theatre museum

People with the given name Samar (Sanskrit/ Hindi)
Samar Banerjee, Indian footballer, popularly known as Badru
Samar Das, Bangladeshi musician and composer
Samar Guha, Indian politician and Indian independence movement activist
Samar Halarnkar, editor-at-large of Hindustan Times
Samar Sen (1916–1987), Indian poet and fingerstyle singer-songwriter

People with the given name and surname Samar (Arabic) 

 Samar Andeel (b. 1987), a female singer from Egypt
 Samar Kokash (b. 1972), Syrian actress and voice actress
Samar Minallah, Pakistani human right activist
Samar Mubarakmand (b. 1942), Pakistani nuclear physicist
Sima Samar (b. 1957),  Afghan human rights activist

Places with the given name Samar
Samar, an Island in the Philippine Archipelago

References

Arabic feminine given names
Indian masculine given names